Justin McInnis (born July 27, 1996) is a Canadian football wide receiver for the BC Lions of the Canadian Football League (CFL). He played college football at Arkansas State.

College career 
McInnis played college football at Arkansas State. Before attending Arkansas State, McInnis played junior college football at Dodge City Community College, where he recorded 49 receptions for 964 yards and 7 touchdowns as a freshman. During his career at Arkansas State, he played in 25 games, totaling 110 receptions for 1,548 yards and 10 touchdowns.

Professional career

Saskatchewan Roughriders
McInnis was selected sixth overall in the 2019 CFL Draft by the Saskatchewan Roughriders. Before being drafted by the Roughriders, McInnis attended minicamps tryouts for the Tennessee Titans and the Indianapolis Colts of the National Football League. McInnis played in 14 games in his rookie season, and made 10 catches out of 18 passes thrown his way for 149 yards.

After the 2020 CFL season was cancelled, McInnis returned in 2021, but spent much of his sophomore season on the injured list as he played in just six games and recorded five catches for 83 yards. During the 2022 season, he had the best game of his career, as he had six catches for 111 yards and one touchdown on August 19, 2022, against the BC Lions. It was also the first touchdown of his professional career as he caught a four-yard pass from Mason Fine. McInnis played in 13 regular season games in 2022 where he had 33 catches for 364 yards and two touchdowns. He became a free agent upon the expiry of his contract on February 14, 2023.

BC Lions
On February 14, 2023, it was announced that McInnis had signed with the BC Lions to a two-year contract.

References

External links 
BC Lions bio

1996 births
Living people
Arkansas State Red Wolves football players
BC Lions players
Canadian football people from Montreal
Canadian football wide receivers
Dodge City Conquistadors football players
People from Pierrefonds-Roxboro
Saskatchewan Roughriders players